Jewish World Watch (JWW) is a non-profit humanitarian organization dedicated to helping survivors of genocide and mass atrocities around the world.

Mission 
JWW is primarily focused on the conflicts in the Democratic Republic of the Congo, Myanmar, Sudan, South Sudan, and Syria. Since their inception, they have donated over $6 million in humanitarian assistance to the people of Sudan and Congo.

History 
Rabbi Harold M. Schulweis and Janice Kamenir-Reznik established Jewish World Watch (JWW) in 2004 on the principle of Tikkun Olam (repairing the world), after learning of the genocide occurring in Darfur, Sudan, and recalling the Holocaust, and the 1994 Rwandan genocide. Since its founding, JWW has grown from a collection of Southern California synagogues to include support from schools, churches, and partner organizations across the country.

In March 2010, JWW became a member of the Eastern Congo Initiative founded by Ben Affleck. As of 2017, Susan Freudenheim, former executive editor at the Jewish Journal, is the executive director.

Walk to End Genocide 
Jewish World Watch hosts an annual fundraising walk called the Walk to End Genocide. In 2019, the Walk took place in two locations, Los Angeles (March 31) and the Conejo Valley (April 7).

References

External links 
 Jewish World Watch official website
 Charity Navigator

Walk to End Genocide
Porter, Bailey. "Recipe for Safety: Jewish women do mitzvah for Darfur refugees". Ms. Winter 2007.

Jewish-American political organizations
Jewish charities based in the United States
Charities based in California